The "Mighty Girl" effect is the documented effect of firstborn, school-age daughters making their fathers less sexist and more aware of gender inequalities. The effect is only robust among fathers and
driven by parenting school age rather than younger daughters, which is consistent with a social identity explanation.

Harvard and Stanford researchers found "that having a daughter (vs. having a son) causes men to reduce their support for traditional gender roles."

Similar results were found by other researchers:

 Firstborn daughters specifically create this effect. Having a daughter after a son(s) has not been found to cause a shift in fathers' views of gender equity.

 Being a father to a school-age girl causes them to hold less traditional views on gender roles and norms. This phenomenon, known as the "Mighty Girl Effect," describes the vicarious and empathetic learning that fathers undergo while witnessing the challenges their daughters face as they grow up. The new study, published in the journal Oxford Economic Papers on December 14, tracked the responses of more than 5,000 men who rated their level of agreements with statements such as: "A husband's job is to earn money" and "A wife's job is to look after the home and family."
 Fathers' probability to support traditional gender norms declines by approximately 3 percentage points (8%) when parenting primary school-aged daughters and by 4 percentage points (11%) when parenting secondary school-aged daughters. The effect on mothers' attitudes is generally not statistically significant. These findings are consistent with exposure and identity theories. We conclude that gender norm attitudes are not stable throughout the life-course and can significantly be shaped by adulthood experiences.

The Mighty Boy Effect? 

There is little research on any similar effect on mothers of school-age boys and awareness of things that negatively effect males, a.k.a. reverse sexism. Women whose first child is a boy work less than women with first-born girls. After a first-born boy the probability that women have more children increases.

See also 
 Parenting

References 

Psychological effects
Feminism and the family